Charlie Allen may refer to:
 Charlie Allen (trumpeter) (1908–1972), American jazz trumpeter
 Charlie Allen (designer) (born 1958), British menswear designer and tailor
 Charlie Allen (singer) (1942–1990), front man for 1960s group Pacific Gas & Electric
 Charlie Allen (footballer, born 1992), English footballer
 Charlie Allen (footballer, born 2003), Northern Irish footballer
 Charlie Allen (engineer), Maxim application engineer known for proposing the MAX232 and Charlieplexing
 Charlie "Scoop" Allen, trumpeter with Bar-Kays

See also
 Charlie Allan (disambiguation)
 Charles Allen (disambiguation)
 Allen (surname)